Isotrias rectifasciana, the hedge shade, is a species of moth of the family Tortricidae found in Asia and Europe. The moth was first described by the English entomologist, Adrian Hardy Haworth in 1811.

Distribution
This species can be found in Great Britain, the Benelux, France, Germany, Denmark, Switzerland, Austria, Italy, the Czech Republic, Slovenia, Croatia, Bosnia and Herzegovina, Hungary, Romania and Greece, as well as Turkey and Russia.

Habitat
These moths prefer hedgerows, woodland rides and margins, where hawthorn, oak and other host plants are present, but also it can be found on coastal salt marshes.

Description

Adults are sexually dimorphic. The wingspan reach 11–14 mm in females, while males have less distinct forewing markings and they are larger, as their wingspan reach 14–16 mm. Forewings are grey-brown, with darker brown transversal markings. This species is quite similar to moths belonging to genus Cnephasia, but the hedge shade has directly transverse dark brown markings.

Biology
Adults are on wing from May to July in one generations per year, flies from dusk onwards and comes to light.

The life-history of this species is imperfectly known but larvae have been reared from, and pupa found on, hawthorn (Crataegus species). Larvae have also been reared on Acer and oak (Quercus species). They feed from within a silken tube on the underside of a leaf.

References

External links
 Lepiforum
 HMBG
 Plant Parasites of Europe

Polyorthini
Moths described in 1811
Moths of Asia
Moths of Europe
Taxa named by Adrian Hardy Haworth